Le Poste des Cadodaquious was a small French fort founded in 1719; it was located northwest of Texarkana, Texas in today's Bowie County.  Recent analysis suggests that the site was somewhere on the escarpment near either Everett or Barkman.

The fort was constructed by Bénard de La Harpe as a part of his land concession.  It was an opportunistic advance, and was made in an area where the Spanish had built similar military outposts.  The fort was constructed on the south bank of the Red River near a village of Nasoni Indians.  As a result, the fort was sometimes known as Le Poste des Nassonites.  The more common name came from the French pronunciation of "Kadohadacho", which was a name used by various Caddoan groups to describe either themselves or the area in which they lived.  La Harpe served as the first commandant of the fort.  Upon his departure in late 1719 the site was garrisoned by a detachment from Natchitoches, Louisiana, with Louis Juchereau de St. Denis as its leader.  Alexis Grappe, a trader and interpreter, was also of some importance in the history of the fort.

The only military purpose the fort could serve was to limit the northern influence of the Spanish; additionally, it served as a station for trade.  It was the base, in 1719, used by Durivage and Mustel when they explored the Red River.  La Harpe would later move on to the northwest, using the post as a starting point, and encounter various groups of Wichita with which the French soon set up a trade network.  The post served as a supply base for a number of other expeditions, including those of Fabry de La Bruyere in 1742 and Pierre A. Mallet in 1750.  And it was from here that Jean Baptiste Brevel departed for Santa Fe in 1767.  A small settlement of French colonists developed in tandem with the fort for a number of years; at least two of Grappe's children, François and Marie Pelagie, were born there, as was Jean Baptiste Brevel.  The French abandoned the area for good after the cession of Louisiana.

In 1770 Athanase de Mézières attempted to re-establish the post, this time for the Spanish; its new name was to be San Luiz de los Cadodachos.  The Nasonis deserted the area soon thereafter.  In 1806, Thomas Freeman attempted, and failed, to find the location of the post.

References

External links
 Handbook of Texas entry

Buildings and structures in Bowie County, Texas
Spanish Texas
Forts in Texas
New France
1719 establishments in the French colonial empire